Yay may refer to:
 St. Anthony Airport, Newfoundland and Labrador, Canada, by IATA code
 Gwune language, by ISO 639-3 code
 Yay language, an alternate name for Bouyei, in southern Guizhou Province in mainland China
 Youth Assisting Youth, a volunteer-based peer mentoring program based in Toronto, Ontario, Canada

See also
 "Yay Yay", a 2013 song by American hip hop recording artist Schoolboy Q
 Jay (disambiguation)
 Yea (disambiguation)